"Lust" is a single by American rapper Lil Skies. It was released for digital download on December 12, 2017, as the third single from his mixtape Life of a Dark Rose. The song peaked at  87 on the Billboard Hot 100.

Music video
The video was directed by Nicholas Jandora.
It depicts Skies as a detective who follows a female robber, whom he deems attractive. She later drugs Skies and the music video goes on when he is under the influence, and clearly captivated by the female's charm.
It is partially animated and partially real-life visuals.

Charts

Certifications

References

2017 singles
2017 songs
Atlantic Records singles
Lil Skies songs
Songs written by CashMoneyAP
Songs written by Lil Skies